Weil ich dich liebe... is an East German film. It was released in 1969.

External links 
 

1969 films
East German films
1960s German-language films
1960s German films